The Century Institute is a summer program for politically liberal college students. It is sponsored by the   Century Foundation, a liberal think tank started in 1919 by Edward A. Filene.

Its faculty has included many late 20th Century progressivism, including Prof. William Julius Wilson, activist Todd Gitlin, academic Arthur Schlesinger Jr. and UN official Gillian Martin Sorensen and her husband, John F. Kennedy advisor and speechwriter Theodore C. Sorensen.  Others included journalist Al From, writer Jedediah Purdy, Clinton advisor Robert Reich and strategist/blogger Ruy Teixeira.

From 1999 until 2003, CISP was held on the campus of Williams College in western Massachusetts, drawing 30 students each year from prestigious colleges.  Unfortunately, in a fate common to many progressive causes, it faced funding troubles from the beginning.  Money ran out in 2004 and the program was canceled for 2005.
 
The program's few dozen alumni have begun careers in law, academia, politics, journalism, education and overseas service.

Advisors 
CISP'S original board of advisors:

Alan Sagner, founder, Sagner Family Foundation
Alan Brinkley Allan Nevis Professor of History, Columbia University
Alicia Munnell Peter F. Drucker Chair in Management Sciences, Boston College
Richard C. Leone, president, The Century Foundation
Arthur Schlesinger Jr., City University of New York
Theodore C. Sorensen, speechwriter and advisor to President John F. Kennedy
William Julius Wilson, Harvard University
Paul Starr, cofounder and editor of The American Prospect

References
Foundation Center
"Only 30 students in nation selected"
Information at University of Mass.

External links 
Century Institute Website
Articles by Century Institute students

1999 establishments in the United States
2004 disestablishments in the United States
Political organizations based in the United States